The Deputy Chairman of Committees is a position in the Parliament of Sri Lanka.

List of Deputy Chairman of Committees 

Parties

See also 
Parliament of Sri Lanka 
Cabinet of Sri Lanka

External links 
Parliament of Sri Lanka – Handbook of Parliament, Deputy Chairman of Committees

References